This is the list of all the winners of the Canadian Chess Championship, often referred to as the Canadian Closed Championship to distinguish it from the annual Canadian Open tournament. The winner of the Canadian Closed advances to the World Cup stage of the FIDE World Chess Championship cycle. Winners on tiebreak or a playoff match are noted with an asterisk beside their names.

1872 tournament not completed
1873 Albert Ensor
1874 William Hicks
1875 George Jackson
1876 Edward Sanderson
1877 Henry Howe
1878 Jacob Ascher
1879 Edwin Pope
1881 Joseph Shaw
1882 Edward Sanderson
1883 Jacob Ascher, Henry Howe
1884 François-Xavier Lambert
1886 Nicholas MacLeod
1887 George Barry *, Nicholas MacLeod
1888 Nicholas MacLeod *, James Narraway, Edwin Pope
1889 Richard Fleming *, James Narraway
1890 Robert Short
1891 A. Thomas Davison
1892 William Boultbee
1893 James Narraway
1894 A. Thomas Davison
1897 James Narraway
1898 James Narraway
1899 Magnus Smith
1904 Magnus Smith
1906 Magnus Smith
1908 Joseph Sawyer
1910 John Morrison
1913 John Morrison *, Charles Blake
1920 Sydney Gale *, John Harvey
1922 John Morrison
1924 John Morrison
1926 John Morrison
1927 Maurice Fox
1929 Maurice Fox
1931 Maurice Fox *, John Morrison, George Eastman
1932 Maurice Fox
1933 Robert Martin
1934 John Belson
1935 Maurice Fox
1936 Boris Blumin
1937 Boris Blumin
1938 Maurice Fox
1940 Maurice Fox
1941 Daniel Yanofsky
1943 Daniel Yanofsky
1945 Daniel Yanofsky, Frank Yerhoff
1946 John Belson
1947 Daniel Yanofsky
1949 Maurice Fox
1951 Povilas Vaitonis
1953 Frank Anderson, Daniel Yanofsky
1955 Frank Anderson
1957 Povilas Vaitonis
1959 Daniel Yanofsky
1961 Lionel Joyner
1963 Daniel Yanofsky
1965 Daniel Yanofsky
1969 Duncan Suttles *, Zvonko Vranesic
1972 Peter Biyiasas
1975 Peter Biyiasas
1978 Jean Hébert
1981 Igor V. Ivanov
1984 Kevin Spraggett
1985  Raymond Stone*, Igor V. Ivanov
1986 Igor V. Ivanov, Kevin Spraggett
1987 Igor V. Ivanov
1989 Kevin Spraggett
1991 Lawrence Day
1992 Alexandre Le Siège
1994 Kevin Spraggett
1995 Ron Livshits *, François Leveille, Bryon Nickoloff
1996 Kevin Spraggett
1999 Alexandre Le Siège
2001 Alexandre Le Siège *, Kevin Spraggett
2002 Pascal Charbonneau *, Kevin Spraggett
2004 Pascal Charbonneau *, Eric Lawson
2006 Igor Zugic
2007 Nikolay Noritsyn *, Jean Hébert, Ron Livshits, Artiom Samsonkin
2009 Jean Hébert 
2011 Bator Sambuev *, Eric Hansen
2012 Bator Sambuev
2015 Tomas Krnan *, Eric Hansen, Leonid Gerzhoy
2017 Bator Sambuev *, Nikolay Noritsyn
2019 Evgeny Bareev

Canadian Women's Championship
Winners on tiebreak or a playoff match are noted with an asterisk beside their names.
1975 Smilja Vujosevic
1978 Nava Sterenberg
1981 Nava Sterenberg
1984 Nava Sterenberg
1986 Nava Sterenberg
1989 Nava Sterenberg
1991 Nava Starr (née Sterenberg)
1995 Nava Starr (née Sterenberg)
1996 Johanne Charest
2001 Nava Starr (née Sterenberg)
2004 Dinara Khaziyeva
2006 Natalia Khoudgarian *, Dina Kagramanov
2007 Natalia Khoudgarian
2009 Dina Kagramanov
2011 Natalia Khoudgarian
2012 Natalia Khoudgarian
2016 Qiyu Zhou
2018 Maili-Jade Ouellet

References

Sources

Canada
Canadian chess championship
Chess
Championship
Chess